The Nalakankar Himal is a small subrange of the Himalayan range in southern Tibet and the northwest corner of Nepal. It lies south of Lake Manasarowar. Its southern boundary is the Humla Karnali, a tributary of the Karnali, one of the major rivers of western Nepal. This river separates the range from the Gurans Himal to the south and the eastern Kumaon to the southwest. On the east, the pass known as Lapche La marks the dividing point between the Nalakankar Himal and the Chandi Himal. To the north and northwest, the range fades into the northern foothills of the Himalaya and the Tibetan Plateau.

The range has only three named peaks, of which only one is over 7,000 m (22,966 ft), namely Gurla Mandhata, or Naimona'nyi. This is a particularly high peak at 7,694 m (25,242 ft), but due to its position on the dry side of the Himalayas, well onto the Tibetan Plateau, it is neither particularly steep nor high above local terrain. The entire range is little visited, partly due to its isolated location.

References
 H. Adams Carter, "Classification of the Himalaya," American Alpine Journal, 1985, pp. 132–134.

Mountain ranges of the Himalayas
Mountain ranges of Nepal
Mountain ranges of Tibet